Herbert M. Gladstone (August 31, 1915 – January 12, 2010) was an American Democratic Party politician who served on the township council of River Vale, New Jersey, and one term in the New Jersey General Assembly.

Biography
Gladstone was born in New York City in 1915. He attended New York University, University of Mississippi, University of Washington, and Brooklyn College. Gladstone was a member of the Bergen County Democratic committee for 15 years. In 1958, he became the first Democrat to sit on the River Vale township council; he served there until 1958. He also served on various local boards and committees. Gladstone was married to Imra Jean and had three children.

In 1973, Gladstone was elected to the New Jersey General Assembly from the newly created, northern Bergen County-based 39th district alongside fellow Democrat Harold Martin. One of his opponents in the election was incumbent Republican Robert C. Veit. During his one term in the Assembly, he cast one of the final yes votes to create a state income tax in 1974. Gladstone decided to retire in 1975 after one term.

Gladstone later moved to Royal Palm Beach, Florida, where he twice ran unsuccessfully for mayor. He died there on January 12, 2012, at the age of 94.

References

1915 births
2010 deaths
People from River Vale, New Jersey
People from Palm Beach County, Florida
Politicians from Bergen County, New Jersey
New York University alumni
University of Mississippi alumni
University of Washington alumni
Brooklyn College alumni
New Jersey city council members
Democratic Party members of the New Jersey General Assembly